The Great Northwest Athletic Conference men's basketball tournament is the annual conference basketball championship tournament for the Great Northwest Athletic Conference. The tournament has been held annually since 2011. It is a single-elimination tournament and seeding is based on regular season records.

The winner, declared conference champion, receives the conference's automatic bid to the NCAA Men's Division II Basketball Championship.

Tournament format
Since its establishment in 2011, the GNAC tournament began as an 8-team tournament but has since decreased in size to six teams. The eight-team tournament, played during 2011 and 2012, featured all teams contesting the initial quarterfinal. Meanwhile, the six-team tournament, played since 2013, gave the two top-seeded teams a bye into the semifinals while the remaining teams played in the preliminary quarterfinal round. 

Aside from the inaugural tournament in 2011 which was played only on team campuses, the remaining tournaments have been played at rotation amongst the members.

Results

Championship records

 Simon Fraser has not yet qualified for the finals of the tournament.
 Concordia (OR) never qualified for the tournament finals as a GNAC member

See also
 Great Northwest Athletic Conference women's basketball tournament

References

NCAA Division II men's basketball conference tournaments
Tournament
Recurring sporting events established in 2011